The Clapton Stadium, also known as Millfields Road, was a football ground and greyhound racing stadium in the Lower Clapton area of London.

History
The stadium was originally named Whittles Athletic Ground and was mostly used for whippet racing. It was built on top of an old fireworks manufactory on the north side of Millfields Road.

Football
In 1896 Clapton Orient moved to the site from Pond Land Bridge, after which it became known as Millfields Road. The football club began redeveloping the stadium, with large embankments built around the pitch using slag from an adjacent power station.

Clapton Orient were elected to the Second Division of the Football League in 1905, and the first Football League was played at the ground on 9 September 1905, with Orient beating Hull City 1–0 in front of 3,000 spectators. In 1906 the first covered spectator facility was provided, when a 2,000-seat grandstand was built. This stand was sold to Wimbledon to use at their Plough Lane ground in 1923, and was replaced by a 3,000-seat stand.

Orient set their record League attendance at the ground on 16 March 1929 when 37,615 saw them lose 3–2 to Tottenham Hotspur. However, the club were in financial trouble at the end of the 1920s and were forced to leave the ground, moving to the Lea Bridge Stadium. Their last match at the ground was a 4–1 win over Brighton on 3 May 1930 with 8,763 in attendance.

Greyhound racing

Pre-World War II
In 1927 the Clapton Stadium Syndicate became joint tenants, and major alterations were made to the ground to allow for greyhound racing, costing over £80,000. An oval track was installed around the football pitch, with covered concrete terracing laid on the three sides away from the main stand. The new layout was designed by Owen Williams, and the ground became London's fourth greyhound track, staging its first meeting on 7 April 1928.

In 1928 the track hosted a new race over 400 yards that gained classic status called the Scurry Gold Cup. In 1930 the stadium opened its first restaurant and the stands were renovated becoming covered stands. The first managing director was H.Garland Wells, who was joint vice president of the National Greyhound Racing Society and the company were called Clapton Stadium Ltd and also owned Reading, and later South Shields and Warrington. Clapton was described as a small difficult course with short straights (76 yards) and easy bends on a circumference of 359 yards with the hare system being a 'Centre Scott Magee Silent'. The nearby training quarters at Claverhambury Farm in Waltham Abbey had two hundred acres of grassland in rural surroundings with six resident trainers and six ranges of kennels with each range having a five-acre plot for exercising.

In 1934 the track was represented in the 1934 English Greyhound Derby final by Wild Woolley locally trained by Harry Woolner and Joe Coral (Gala Coral Group) was a bookmaker at the track before his Empire grew. A second Derby final appearance by arrived in the 1938 English Greyhound Derby after Demotic Mack finished fifth for trainer Charles Cross. The same greyhound then emulated the feat one year later finishing third this time.

In 1939 the greyhound track underwent improvements and a second restaurant was built.

Post-war

The stadium closed for short periods during the war but was still able to race at other times. The appointment of trainer Stan Biss was a success, he trained greyhounds called Local Interprize and Rimmells Black. Local Interprize a black dog went onto win the Welsh Greyhound Derby, the Gold Collar twice, the Cesarewitch, Scurry Gold Cup and reached the English Derby final twice. Garland-Wells died in 1948 and the stadium established notable events called the Metropolitan Cup, National Sprint, London Cup & National Open Hurdles.

In 1952 Clapton appointed trainer Jimmy Jowett from Warrington and there was another Derby final appearance with the Tom Smith trained Paddys Dinner. In 1953 the director of racing was Eric Godfrey, and the racing manager was Mr H. J. Richardson, and the six resident trainers were John Snowball, Arch Whitcher, Clare Orton, Jimmy Jowett, Gordon Nicholson and Tom Smith. Also in 1953 a new lighting system was installed.

The stadium won its first Derby crown in 1956 after the Paddy McEvoy-trained Dunmore King prevailed, and five years later Palms Printer won the Derby, claiming a second win for Paddy McEvoy. Dromin Glory was voted 1962 Greyhound of the year, and a third Derby title in 1963 went to the John Bassett-trained Lucky Boy Boy. The Claverhambury Farm, in Waltham Cross, produced six Derby winners between 1956 and 1972; they were Dunmore King, Palms Printer, Lucy Boy Boy, Chittering Clapton, Faithful Hope and Patricias Hope.

During 1963 Clapton Stadiums Ltd scrapped evening starting times in an attempt to stop the bookmaker shops from being able to take advantage of their off-course betting following the introduction of the Betting and Gaming Act 1960, and in the same year the track hosted Pinewood Studios as they shot scenes for a new film starring Rita Tushingham and Mike Sarne called Bethnal Green.

The company sold Slough Stadium to the Greyhound Racing Association (GRA) in 1966 and the Clapton shareholders contemplated a bid from GRA which included Clapton Stadium, two training sites with 180 acres and an interest in the West Ham site. The deal went ahead later that year. Clapton was the first track to install a closed-circuit television race patrol camera in 1967 that was able to replay the races to the public.

The GRA and in particular the GRA Property Trust were actively selling prime areas of land to developers and there was uncertainty surrounding the track and it was dealt a blow when in 1968 all of the greyhounds were relocated to the Northaw Kennels from the Clapton kennels at Claverhambury Farm. Despite the sale of the kennels trainers Adam Jackson and Paddy Keane both secured Derby wins with Chittering Clapton and Faithful Hope respectively. A sixth Derby crown was won by the track when a greyhound with superstar status called Patricias Hope won 1972 English Greyhound Derby.

Closure
In 1969 the GRA sold the track to what was effectively a redevelopment company. The sale of the popular track caused much upset regardless of the fact that there were no immediate plans for closing. On 1 January 1974 the stadium closed and was later demolished making way for the Millfields
housing estate in the early 1980s.

Other uses
In the early 1930s the stadium was used as a major venue for boxing and also used for baseball.

Greyhound racing competitions

Scurry Gold Cup

Metropolitan Cup

London Cup

National Open Hurdles

Orient Cup

Track records

References

Defunct football venues in England
Leyton Orient F.C.
Defunct sports venues in London
Defunct greyhound racing venues in the United Kingdom
Defunct baseball venues
Baseball venues in the United Kingdom
English Football League venues
Defunct greyhound racing venues in London
Clapton, London
1974 disestablishments in England
History of baseball in the United Kingdom